India Kate Gants (born June 11, 1996) is an American fashion model. She is best known for winning the twenty-third cycle of America's Next Top Model in 2017.

Early life
Gants was born in Seattle, Washington. She has three younger siblings. She started modeling when she was 16. She graduated from Newport High School in 2014. Gants lived in Bellevue before auditioning for Top Model.

Career

America's Next Top Model
In 2016–2017, Gants appeared in the twenty-third cycle of VH1's America's Next Top Model, where she competed against thirteen other contestants. During the show, many comparisons were made of her and Gigi Hadid. At the final deliberation in the season finale, she beat fellow competitor Tatiana Price, becoming the twenty-third winner of the show. Among Gants' prizes for winning America's Next Top Model were a talent contract with VH1, a fashion spread in Paper magazine and a $100,000 contract with Rimmel London cosmetics.

Gants win also means that she is the seventh winner of America's Next Top Model to have never made an appearance in the bottom two, along with Jaslene Gonzalez, McKey Sullivan, Nicole Fox, Krista White,  Sophie Sumner and Jourdan Miller.

Post Top Model
Following her win on America's Next Top Model, Gants signed a contract with Major Model Management in Milan. She is also signed with Ford Models in New York City. She is still signed with Seattle Models Guild.

Gants appeared in the season three premiere episode of Odd Mom Out in July 2017.

Gants also started working in the music industry as a DJ. She also appeared in the lyric video for WISH I WAS's "Go For A Ride".

In 2021 India appeared and stared in the music video for the Emo revival band Your Broken Hero's song Tommy's Face.

References

External links

Female models from Washington (state)
America's Next Top Model contestants
America's Next Top Model winners
Living people
Next Top Model winners
People from Seattle
Top Model contestants
1996 births
21st-century American women